John H. Jones (January 1857 – July 23, 1934) was an American politician in the state of Washington. He served in the Washington State Senate from 1889 to 1891.

References

1857 births
1934 deaths
Republican Party Washington (state) state senators
English emigrants to the United States